Events from the 9th century in England.

Events
 801
Northumbrian invasion of Mercia fails.
 802
 Ecgberht becomes King of Wessex following the death of Beorhtric.
 803
Council of Clofeshoh abolishes the Archbishopric of Lichfield.
 805
 12 May – death of Æthelhard, Archbishop of Canterbury.
 3 August – enthronement of Wulfred as Archbishop of Canterbury.
 806
 Eardwulf of Northumbria is deposed and apparently succeeded by Ælfwald II. In 808 Eardwulf perhaps returns to the throne for an uncertain period.
 815
 Ecgberht of Wessex harries Cornwall.
 816
 Saxons invade the mountains of Eryri and the kingdom of Rhufoniog.
 818
 King Coenwulf of Mercia devastates Dyfed.
 821
 Wulfred, Archbishop of Canterbury, submits to Coenwulf of Mercia in a dispute over Church lands.
 King Coenwulf of Mercia dies at Basingwerk near Holywell, Flintshire, probably while preparing a campaign against the Welsh. Succession is disputed.
 822
 Mercian army under Ceolwulf destroys the fortress of Degannwy and takes control of Powys.
 17 September – Ceolwulf I of Mercia is consecrated as successor to his brother King Coenwulf by Archbishop Wulfred of Canterbury.
 823
 After 26 May – Ceolwulf I of Mercia is overthrown as king by Beornwulf, whose pedigree is not known.
 825
 September – Battle of Ellendun (on the North Wessex Downs): Ecgberht, King of Wessex, defeats the Mercians under Beornwulf, and subdues Essex, Sussex, and Kent, ending the Mercian Supremacy.
 A fight of Welsh/Britons and Devon-men at Gafulford in the south-west.
 825–827
 Æthelwulf, son of Ecgberht of Wessex, drives Baldred from his Kingdom of Kent, which Æthelwulf then rules as sub-king to his father.
 826
 After 27 March – Beornwulf of Mercia is killed in battle while attempting to suppress a rebellion by the East Angles and is succeeded by Ludeca.
 827
 Wiglaf becomes King of Mercia for the first time following the killing of Ludeca on a campaign against the East Angles.
 829
 Ecgberht of Wessex temporarily conquers Mercia, driving Wiglaf from his throne there, and receives the submission of the Northumbrian king at Dore.
 830
 Wiglaf of Mercia resumes his throne.
 Nennius completes his Historia Brittonum.
 832
 24 March – death of Wulfred, Archbishop of Canterbury.
 9 June – consecration of Feologild as Archbishop of Canterbury.
 30 August – death of Feologild.
 833
 27 August – consecration of Ceolnoth as Archbishop of Canterbury.
 835
 Vikings raid Sheppey.
 838
 Battle of Hingston Down: Ecgberht of Wessex defeats combined Danish Viking and Cornish armies.
 839
 King Wiglaf of Mercia dies and is succeeded, probably in 840, by Beorhtwulf.
 Ecgberht, King of Wessex, dies and is succeeded by his son Æthelwulf.
 841
 Vikings raid the south and east coasts, including the Kingdom of Lindsey.
 842
 Vikings raid London, Rochester, and Southampton.
 844
 Approximate date of Battle of Cetyll in which Beorhtwulf of Mercia defeats Merfyn Frych, King of Gwynedd.
 849
Alfred, son of Æthelwulf of Wessex and Queen Osburh, is born at Wantage.
 851
 Kentish ships defeat Vikings off Sandwich in the first recorded naval battle in English history.
 Vikings over-winter in England for the first time, on the Isle of Thanet.
 852
 Swithun becomes Bishop of Winchester.
 Probable death of King Beorhtwulf of Mercia.
 853
 King Æthelwulf sends his son Alfred to the papal court in Rome.
 855
 King Æthelwulf, accompanied by Alfred, sets off on a pilgrimage to Rome and appoints his second son Æthelbald as King of Wessex and his next eldest son Æthelberht as ruler of the Kingdom of Kent in his absence.
 856
 1 October – King Æthelwulf marries as his second wife the teenage Judith of Flanders at Verberie and she is crowned queen of Wessex. He returns to Wessex but Æthelbald retains rule of part of the kingdom.
 858
 13 January – Æthelbald succeeds his father Æthelwulf as King of Wessex and marries his father's widow.
 860
 20 December – Æthelbald dies and is succeeded by his brother, sub-king Æthelberht of Kent, who becomes sole ruler of Wessex.
 865
 Autumn
 Æthelberht dies and Æthelred becomes King of Wessex.
 The Great Heathen Army of Viking invaders lands in East Anglia.
 866
 November – Vikings led by Ivar the Boneless capture York.
 867
 21 March – Vikings defeat Northumbrians, killing their kings Osberht and Ælla, in battle at York and install a puppet ruler, Ecgberht.
 869
 20 November –  Vikings conquer East Anglia, killing King Edmund the Martyr.
 870
 Vikings capture Reading.
 4 February – death of Ceolnoth, Archbishop of Canterbury. He is succeeded by Æthelred.
 871
 The English retreat onto the Berkshire Downs. The Great Heathen Army, led by the Danish Viking kings Halfdan Ragnarsson and Bagsecg, march out after the Saxons. Six pitched battles are fought between the Vikings and Wessex. Of two of them the place and date are not recorded, the others are given here:
 4 January – Battle of Reading: A West Saxon force, under the command of King Æthelred I and his brother Alfred, is defeated by the Vikings at Reading. Among the many dead on both sides is Æthelwulf of Berkshire. The Saxon troops are forced to retreat, allowing the Vikings to continue their advance into Wessex.
 8 January – Battle of Ashdown: The West Saxons, led by Æthelred I and Alfred, gather on the Berkshire Downs. The Vikings under the command of Halfdan and Bagsecg occupy the high ground, but are successfully attacked by Alfred's men. During the battle Alfred breaches the shield wall formation.
 22 January – Battle of Basing: The West Saxon army, under the command of Æthelred I, is defeated at Basing; the Vikings, led by Halfdan, are victorious; Æthelred is forced to flee and regroup, leaving behind precious winter supplies.
 22 March – Battle of Meretum: The West Saxons, led by Æthelred I and Alfred, are defeated by the Vikings under Halfdan, perhaps near Wilton, Wiltshire. Among the many dead is Heahmund, bishop of Salisbury.
 23 April – King Æthelred of Wessex dies and is succeeded by his brother Alfred the Great. Æthelred is buried at Wimborne Minster; while Alfred is making the funeral preparations, his army is again defeated.
 May – Battle of Wilton: Alfred the Great is defeated by the Vikings at Wilton (along the southern side of the River Wylye), and is forced to makes peace with them, probably paying them Danegeld, and establishes his capital at Winchester.
 Autumn – Vikings withdraw from Reading and sail down the River Thames to raid the Mercian port of Lundenwic (modern-day London) and overwinter here. Viking armies go on to colonize areas of north, central and eastern England, later becoming known as the Danelaw.
 872
 Autumn – The Great Heathen Army returns to Northumbria, to put down a rebellion at York. King Ecgberht I of Northumbria and his archbishop, Wulfhere of York, are expelled by the Northumbrians and flee to Mercia.
 The Vikings, led by Halfdan Ragnarsson and Guthrum, establish a winter quarter at Torksey in the Kingdom of Lindsey (modern-day Lincolnshire). King Burgred of Mercia pays tribute of Danegeld.
 873
 Spring – Vikings return to Northumbria.
 Autumn – Vikings return to Mercia, taking up winter quarters at Repton; Repton Abbey is abandoned.
 874
 Vikings appoint Ceolwulf II as ruler of Mercia having sacked Tamworth and driven Burgred of Mercia into exile.
 875
 Monks leave Lindisfarne, which is being invaded by Vikings, with the body of Saint Cuthbert, and settle at Chester-le-Street.
 Donyarth, last recorded King of Cornwall, drowns in what is thought to be the River Fowey.
 Approximate date – Vikings led by Guthrum invade Alfred's territory.
 876
 Vikings led by Guthrum take Wareham but are forced out following a siege by Alfred.
 Vikings capture southern Northumbria, and found the Kingdom of York, perhaps under Halfdan Ragnarsson.
 877
 Vikings capture Exeter (but are driven out by Alfred), and settle in the Five Boroughs.
 Approximate date – Saxons invaders kill Rhodri the Great, Prince of Gwynedd, and his son (or brother) Gwriad.
 878
 January – Battle of Chippenham; Vikings capture Chippenham, and take control of much of Wessex.
 Early – Battle of Cynwit: Men of Wessex led by Odda, Ealdorman of Devon, prevent an attempted siege by Vikings under Ubba on the south coast of the Bristol Channel and capture their raven banner.
 Easter – Alfred constructs a fort at Athelney, and holds out against the Vikings.
 c.4–6 May – Alfred assembles troops at 'Egbert's Stone' on the edge of Salisbury Plain.
 c.11 May – Battle of Edington in Wiltshire: Alfred defeats the Vikings and besieges them at Chippenham. They capitulate and, by the Treaty of Wedmore, Guthrum is baptised at Aller, Somerset, and retreats in the first instance to Cirencester.
 Guthrum takes control of East Anglia.
 Princes of southern Wales acknowledge Alfred as their overlord.
 886
 Alfred restores London to Mercia.
 Alfred signs a treaty with Guthrum, granting the territory between the Thames and the Tees to the Vikings; later known as the Danelaw.
 Tradition of the Ripon hornblower begins, continuing for at least a thousand years.
 888
 30 June – death of Æthelred, Archbishop of Canterbury. He is succeeded by Plegmund.
 Probable date – Shaftesbury Abbey is founded as a convent by Alfred who installs his daughter Æthelgifu as first abbess.
 890
 The Welsh ruler Anarawd ap Rhodri, King of Gwynedd, makes the first ceremonial visit to an English court, that of Alfred.
 Approximate date – Alfred begins to commission and undertake a series of translations into Old English, beginning with his own version of Pope Gregory I's Pastoral Care.
 892
 Danish Vikings invade again, under the leadership of Hastein.
 Anglo-Saxon Chronicle first compiled.
 893
 Spring
 Edward, the son of King Alfred the Great, defeats invading Danish Vikings at Farnham, and forces them to take refuge on Thorney Island by London. At the same time, Vikings from East Anglia sail around the Cornish coast and besiege Exeter.
 A Danish Viking army under Hastein moves to a burh at Benfleet (Essex); this camp is captured by the Saxons while the army is out raiding and Hastein is forced to retreat to Shoebury.
 Summer – Battle of Buttington: A combined Welsh and Mercian army under Æthelred, Lord of the Mercians besieges a Viking camp at Buttington just over the Welsh border. The Vikings escape with heavy losses and take their families to safety in East Anglia.
 Autumn – Danish Vikings under Hastein take the city of Chester, after a rapid march from East Anglia. Alfred the Great destroys their food supplies, forcing them to move into Wales.
 Asser of Sherborne writes The Life of King Alfred (Vita Ælfredi regis Angul Saxonum).
 894
 Viking forces reach the Thames estuary.
 895
 Alfred blockades the Viking fleet at the River Lea; Vikings retreat to Bridgnorth.
 896
 Viking army leaves Wessex.
 899
 26 October – King Alfred of Wessex dies; succeeded by his son, Edward the Elder.

References

 
British history timelines